The Naguanagua municipality is one of the 14 municipalities (municipios) that makes up the Venezuelan state of Carabobo and, according to the 2011 census by the National Institute of Statistics of Venezuela, the municipality has a population of 157,437.  The town of Naguanagua is the shire town of the Naguanagua Municipality. It forms part of the greater Valencia Metropolitan Area in Venezuela.  It is in the valley of the Cabriales River at the base of Cerro El Café and the El Trigal Mountain.  Valencia and Naguanagua form a continuous urban area. The highway that runs from the centre of Valencia towards Puerto Cabello passes through this community; Bolivar Avenue in Valencia becomes University Avenue in Naguanagua on the northern side of a traffic roundabout, or redoma.

Demographics
The Naguanagua County, according to a 2007 population estimate by the National Institute of Statistics of Venezuela, has a population of 143,315 (up from 134,728 in 2000). This amounts to 6.4% of the state's population.

Government
The mayor of the Naguanagua County is Alejandro Feo la Cruz, elected on November 23, 2008 with 45% of the vote.  He replaced Julio Castillo shortly after the elections. The municipality is divided into one parish (Naguanagua).

History

Naguanagua was founded as a parish district between Valencia and Puerto Cabello. The name of the district/municipio (similar to a county) is Naguanagua, and the main city in the district is Naguanagua. The map at top right shows the municipio in red and the other municipios of Carabobo in gray. Naguanagua was founded as a curacy on 14 May 1782 by the Bishop of Caracas Don Mariano Martí.  The name Naguanagua means "Abundance of Waters".

Tourism and places of interest

Downtown Naguanagua features the Parochial Church of Naguanagua, the Parochial House and Bolívar Square. Near the Carabobo Hospital is the Spaniards Road (Camino de Los Españoles), Colonial Way at the San Esteban National Park (Parque Nacional San Esteban), where one can to go down to San Esteban town near to Puerto Cabello. Also, you can visit La Entrada, a village near Naguanagua where there is the Atanasio Girardot Monument. 
Between the Sport Square are the "Don Bosco Field" (Campo Don Bosco) in the downtown, the "Simón Bolívar Bicentennial Sport Complex" in La Granja, the "Patinodrome of Capremco" and the "University City Sport Complex" in the Campus Bárbula. Naguanagua has the largest shopping centres Carabobo State including Sambil Centre in Ciudad Jardín Mañongo, La Granja Shopping Centre, Cristal Naguanagua Centre in Las Quintas III Stage and Vía Veneto Shopping Center in Ciudad Jardín Mañongo. 
Other places include the offices  of El Carabobeño newspaper on University Avenue, Los Guayabitos Park, the Botanical Garden of Naguanagua (Salvador Feo La Cruz Avenue), Paseo La Granja Park (Venezuela Avenue), Liberty Park or the Peace Park (Liberty Corner, 10th Street Avenue of Las Quintas, La Granja), Park of Attractions  "Dunas" near the first World Trade Centre of Venezuela, "Hesperia Río Convention Center" (Mañongo Road, Mañongo), and the Park of Attractions "Ditto Park" (Tazajal).

Universities

Naguanagua is the home of the main student campus of the University of Carabobo (Spanish:Universidad de Carabobo (UC)). The administrative offices are in Valencia proper. The campus is quite large and operates as a separate community  with its own security, transportation, and legislative body. Also, there are other universities such as University College of Administration and Trade (Colegio Universitario de Administración y Mercadeo CUAM) near Bárbula Bridge, the National "Open" University  (Universidad Nacional Abierta UNA) in El Retobo, the National Polytechnic Research University of the Armed Forces (Universidad Nacional Experimental Politécnica de las Fuerzas Armadas UNEFA) in Las Quintas I stage, and the Bicentennial University of Aragua (Universidad Bicentenaria de Aragua UBA) in La Campiña.

Transport

Roads
Road transportation inside the city is provided by the Centre Regional Highway (Autopista Regional del Centro (ARC) and major arterials such as University Avenue, Salvador Feo La Cruz (North - South) Avenue(old Cemetery Avenue), Valencia Avenue, Naguanagua's Bolívar Avenue, Salvador Feo La Cruz (Easth-West) Avenue, 190 Avenue, Salvador Allende Avenue (University City Campus Bárbula Universidad de Carabobo).

Rail
The Puerto Cabello and Valencia Railway closed in the 1950s. A new railway is being constructed from Puerto Cabello to La Encrucijada. One of the stations will be in Naguanagua municipality, and it is planned that there will be an interchange connecting the national rail system with the Valencia Metro.

In 2016 work on the Puerto Cabello railway was described as "irregular and marked by slow payments by the client as a result of the country’s poor economic conditions, mainly related to the drop in the price of oil."

Neighborhoods

190 
Agua Linda 
Arturo Ramírez 
Av. 181 Valencia 
Barrio Unión 
Barrio Oeste 
Bella Vista 
Brisas de Carabobo 
Brisas del Café 
Campus Bárbula - Ciudad Universitaria - 
Caprenco 
Carialinda 
Chaguaramal 
Ciudad Jardín Mañongo 
Centro Histórico de Naguanagua 
Colinas de Girardot I 
Colinas de Girardot II 
Colón 
Democracia 
El Cafetal 
El Naranjal I 
El Naranjal II 
El Pinar 
El Piñal 
El Retobo 
El Rincón 
Guayabal 
Guaparo Naguanagüense 
Güere 
Gonzalez Plaza 
La Begoña 
La Campiña I 
La Campiña II 
La Campiña III 
La Cidra 
La Florida 
La Granja I 
La Granja II 
La Llovizna 
La Luz 
La Querencia 
La Sabana 
La Coromoto 
Las Palmeras 
Las Quintas I 
Las Quintas II 
Las Quintas III (Quintas del Norte) 
Lorenzo Fernández 
Los Candiles 
Los Caracaros 
Los Guayabitos 
Malagón 
Mañongo 
Monte Sión 
Negra Matea 
Nueva Esparta 
Palma Real 
Parque Naguanagua 
Puente Bárbula 
Rotafé 
Santa Ana 
Santa Eduviges (Vivienda Rural Bárbula) 
Santa Marta 
Tarapio 
Tazajal 
Terrazas de Naguanagua 
Terrazas de Paramacay 
Valle Verde

References

External links
naguanagua-carabobo.gob.ve 
Municipal Government of Naguanagua site 
Naguanagua Forest 

Municipalities of Carabobo
Populated places established in 1782
1782 establishments in the Spanish Empire